Diatenopteryx is a genus of flowering plants belonging to the family Sapindaceae.

Its native range is Southeastern and Southern Brazil to Bolivia and Northeastern Argentina.

Species:

Diatenopteryx grazielae 
Diatenopteryx sorbifolia

References

Sapindaceae
Sapindaceae genera